Tall Borj (also Romanized as Tāl Borj) is a village in Hayat Davud Rural District, in the Central District of Ganaveh County, Bushehr Province, Iran. At the 2006 census, its population was 43, in 7 families.

References 

Populated places in Ganaveh County